John B. Wood (May 1872 – January 30, 1929) was a professional baseball pitcher. He appeared in one game in Major League Baseball for the St. Louis Browns on May 9, 1896. He faced four batters without retiring any, giving up one hit, two walks and one hit batsman. Although he gave up just one run, he officially had an infinite earned run average.

External links

Major League Baseball pitchers
St. Louis Browns (NL) players
Baseball players from Harrisburg, Pennsylvania
19th-century baseball players
1872 births
1929 deaths